, there were about 3,700 electric vehicles registered in Kentucky.

Government policy
, the state government does not offer any tax incentives for electric vehicle purchases.

The state is scheduled to implement a $120 registration fee for electric vehicles starting in January 2024.

Charging stations
, there were 210 public charging stations in Kentucky.

The Infrastructure Investment and Jobs Act, signed into law in November 2021, allocates  to charging stations in Kentucky.

Manufacturing
Kentucky has been widely proposed as a hub for electric vehicle manufacturing.

By region

Louisville
, there were 2,737 electric vehicles in Louisville.

References

Kentucky
Road transportation in Kentucky